Scopariinae is a subfamily of the lepidopteran family Crambidae. The subfamily was described by Achille Guenée in 1854.

Genera
Afrarpia Maes, 2004
Afroscoparia Nuss, 2003
Anarpia Chapman, 1912
Antiscopa Munroe, 1964
Caradjaina Leraut, 1986
Cholius Guenée, 1845
Cosipara Munroe, 1972
Dasyscopa Meyrick, 1894
Davana Walker, 1859
Dipleurinodes Leraut, 1989
Elusia Schaus, 1940
Eudipleurina Leraut, 1989
Eudonia Billberg, 1820 (= Boiea Zetterstedt, 1839, Borea Stephens, 1852, Dipleurina Chapman, 1912, Dipluerina Sharp, 1913, Malageudonia Leraut, 1989, Vietteina Leraut, 1989, Witlesia Chapman, 1912, Wittlesia Chapman, 1912)
Gesneria Hübner, 1825 (= Scoparona Chapman, 1912)
Gibeauxia Leraut, 1988
Helenoscoparia Nuss, 1999
Hoenia Leraut, 1986
Iranarpia Leraut, 1982
Micraglossa Warren, 1891 (= Microglossa Hampson, 1907)
Notocrambus Turner, 1922
Pagmanella Leraut, 1985
Scoparia Haworth, 1811 (= Epileucia Stephens, 1852, Eudorea J. Curtis, 1827, Eudoria Chapman, 1912, Eudoroea Bruand, 1851, Phegea Gistel, 1848, Scopea Haworth, 1828, Sineudonia Leraut, 1986, Tetraprosopus Butler, 1882, Xeroscopa Meyrick, 1884)
Syrianarpia Leraut, 1982
Toulgoetodes Leraut, 1988

References

 
 , 1984: Contribution à l'étude des Scopariinae. 4. Révision des types décrits de la région paléarctique occidentale, description de dix nouveaux taxa et ébauche d'une liste des espèces de cette région. (Lepidoptera: Crambidae). Nouvelle Revue d'Entomologie Alexanor: 157–192.
 , 1985: Contribution à l'étude des Scopariinae. 5. Quatre nouveaux taxa d'Afghanistan. (Lepidoptera: Crambidae). Nouvelle Revue d'Entomologie N.S. 2 (3): 325–329.
 , 1986: Contribution à l'étude des Scopariinae. 6. Dix nouveaux taxa, dont trois genres, de Chine et du nord de l'Inde. (Lepidoptera: Crambidae). Nouvelle Revue d'Entomologie N.S. 3 (1): 123–131.
 , 2010: Taxonomic revision and biogeography of Micraglossa Warren, 1891 from laurel forests in China (Insecta: Lepidoptera: Pyraloidea: Crambidae: Scopariinae). Arthropod Systematics & Phylogeny 68 (2): 159–180. Full article: .
 , 1998: The Scopariinae and Heliothelinae stat. rev. (Lepidoptera: Pyraloidea: Crambidae) of the Oriental Region-a revisional synopsis with descriptions of new species from the Philippines and Sumatra. Nachrichten des Entomologischen Vereins Apollo Supplement 17: 475–528.
  1999: Revision der Gattungen der Scopariinae (Lepidoptera: Pyraloidea, Crambidae) [Revision of the Scopariinae genera, Lepidoptera: Pyraloidea, Crambidae.] Nova supplementa entomologica, (13) [Not seen]
 , 1997: A taxonomic revision of the Scopariinae from the Macaronesian Region (Lepidoptera: Pyraloidea: Crambidae). Insect Systematics & Evolution 28 (4): 509–551. Abstract: 
 , 1998: Notes on the Scopariinae from Taiwan, with descriptions of nine new species (Lepidoptera: Crambidae). Tinea 15 (3): 191–201.
  2009: Transfer of All Western Hemisphere Cybalomiinae to Other Subfamilies (Crambidae: Pyraloidea: Lepidoptera): Elusia Schaus, Dichochroma Forbes, Schacontia Dyar, Cybalomia extorris Warren, and C. lojanalis (Dognin). Proceedings of the Entomological Society of Washington 111 (2): 493–504. Abstract: 

 
Crambidae